Baaji is an Indian Marathi language historical television series which aired on Zee Marathi. It premiered from 30 July 2018 by replacing Naammatra. It starred Nupur Daithankar and Abhijeet Shwetchandra in lead roles.

Cast 
 Nupur Daithankar as Hira
 Abhijeet Shwetchandra as Baaji
 Prakhar Singh as Shera
 Adarsh Kadam as Chichoka
 Milind Pemgirikar as Biniwale
 Rajesh Aher as Dadaji
 Vaidehi Mohole as Chandra
 Veena Katti
 Kiran Bhalerao
 Tejas Ghadge
 Bhakti Rasal

References

External links 
 
 Baaji at ZEE5

Marathi-language television shows
2018 Indian television series debuts
Zee Marathi original programming
2019 Indian television series endings